Gauche Révolutionnaire can refer to:
 The defunct Workers and Peasants' Socialist Party
 The currently active Revolutionary Left (France)